FEMNET, also called the African Women's Development and Communication Network, is an organization established in 1988 to promote women's development in Africa.
FEMNET helps non-government organizations share information and approaches on women's development, equality and other human rights.

Activities

FEMNET was originally set up in 1988 by national women's networks to co-ordinate African preparations for the Fourth World Conference on Women held in Beijing, China, in 1995. 
The organization is based in Nairobi, Kenya.
FEMNET has worked with the United Nations Commission on the Status of Women, the World Conference against Racism and the African Union (AU).
Areas of focus with the AU have included the protocol on the Rights of Women in Africa of the African Charter on Human and Peoples' Rights, the Economic, Social and Cultural Council and the New Partnership for African Development.

FEMNET ran its first gender-training workshop in 1990 in Kenya, working with the United Nations Children's Fund (UNICEF) and the Canadian International Development Agency (CIDA). The workshop helped to train trainers, and FEMNET refined the approach and developed material based on results. FEMNET ran training sessions in the 1993–1999 period in Swaziland, Zambia, the United States and Malawi. They were supported by the United Nations Population Fund (UNFPA), UNICEF and the United States Agency for International Development (USAID).
FEMNET ran Train the Trainers sessions in 2000 for partner organizations in South Africa, Uganda and Ghana.
Gender-based trainers have worked in many other countries in Africa.

FEMNET has found that it is critical to involve men in the fight for gender equality. Male gender trainers have had great influence in introducing gender awareness in sectors such as developmental research where gender coirncerns had previously been neglected.
It was assumed that raising awareness of gender issues would be extremely difficult in Swaziland, with its strongly patriarchal traditions.
In fact, as a result of FEMNET assistance through UNFPA, high-level policymakers became sensitized to gender issues and measures to address gender concerns were included in key national plans.
Malawi, where FEMNET has worked with UNFPA and UNICEF, has been another country where great progress has been made in training and sensitizing political leader, agencies and other organizations.

In July 2008, FEMNET coordinated the official launch in Nairobi of the United Nations' Gender Equality Architecture Reform (GEAR) Campaign in Africa. As of 2010, FEMNET was active through membership and local organizations in more than 37 African countries.

Former executive directors
Njoki Wainaina, founder 
Lynne Muthoni Wanyeki
Dinah Musindarwezo

Former chairpeople
Sara Hlupekile Longwe, winner of the 2003 Africa Prize for Leadership.
Mama Koite Doumbia, winner of the 2011 FAMEDEV Gender Award.

References

Women's rights in Africa
Women's organisations based in Kenya